The London General Mourning Warehouse was a mourning warehouse on Regent Street.  It was established by William Chickall Jay in 1841 and so it was commonly known as Jay's.  It sold all types of goods needed for funerals and the elaborate mourning of the Victorian era.

Gallery

References

Shops in London
Mourning warehouses
1841 establishments in England